The Lepanto opening is a type of opening in the board game Diplomacy.  Developed by Edi Birsan, it is used by the generally weak Italy, in alliance with Austria, to attack Turkey. It is named after the Battle of Lepanto, in which the Turkish fleet was destroyed by Spanish (which was then ruled by the German-Austrian house of Habsburg) and Italian forces led by a nominally Austrian commander.

Standard Lepanto

When playing the Lepanto opening, Italy usually opens in Spring 1901 with Fleet: Naples—Ionian Sea (to prepare for the convoy to Tunis), Army:Rome—Apulia (preparing to be convoyed), and Army: Venice HOLD (to conceal Italy's intentions and protect against a stab from Austria).

In Fall 1901, Italy then plays Army:Apulia-Tunis, with Fleet:Ionian Sea convoying the army.  They then build a fleet in Naples, a common site for Italian builds. This allows them to play in Spring 1902 Fleet:Ionian Sea—East Mediterranean and Fleet: Naples—Ionian Sea, with the army in Tunis holding. They can then spring their attack in Fall 1902 with Army:Tunis-Syria (convoyed by the fleets in Ionian Sea and the East Mediterranean). This positional advantage is usually fatal to Turkey, as they will likely be under attack by Austria as well.
Alternatively the army can convoy to Smyrna in an attempt to outwit a Turkish player attempting to counter it.

Problems

The chief problem with the Lepanto opening is that, if they are aware of it, Turkey can easily counter it.  They do this by playing Fleet:Ankara-Constantinople in Spring 1901, followed by Fleet:Constantinople-Aegean Sea in Fall 1901, with a fleet built in Smyrna in the Winter.  In Spring 1902, they then play Fleet:Smyrna-East Mediterranean, bouncing Italy's move.  Therefore, Italy must usually pretend to negotiate an alliance with Turkey against Austria, using the army in Venice (ordered to HOLD) as a decoy.

Another problem lies in the fact that Italy does not get any supply centers other than Tunisia until 1903 at the earliest. Also, until this supply center has been gained, only the army in Venice will be defending Italy, leaving it open to an attack by either Austria or France.

Blue Water Lepanto

Manus Hand's Fall 1901 continuation of the Blue Water Opening.  The Austrian (who opened to the Adriatic) sails to the Ionian in Fall of 1901 to be the victim of an arranged dislodgement by Italian fleets from Naples and Tunis in Spring 1902. Austria's fleet then surprises the Turkish player by retreating eastward to form part of the convoy chain that carries an Italian army to Turkey.

Key Lepanto

The Key Lepanto is an uncommonly employed variation of the Lepanto opening.  The moves are the same as for the standard Lepanto, but rather than holding, Italy plays their army from Venice-Trieste-Serbia (usually with Austrian support to foil Turkey's Army:Bulgaria-Serbia).  The Key Lepanto variation is rarely seen, as it requires great trust on the part of the Austrian player that Italy will not simply decide to stay in Trieste.

See also

 Diplomacy
 Diplomacy World

External links

Original article by Birsan describing the Lepanto opening.
Article on the Key Lepanto by Tony Swinnerton
Online library of Diplomacy openings.
Guide to playing Italy from Wizards of the Coast.
Article from Wizards of the Coast on playing Diplomacy.  See section on Italy.
Sharp, Richard, The game of diplomacy. London : A. Barker, 1978. Online version (retrieved October 2009).  See chapters on Italy, Turkey and Austria.
Article The Blue Water Lepanto; The Diplomatic Pouch
Article The Blue Water Lepanto Revisited; The Diplomatic Pouch
  (2021)

Diplomacy (game)